Beastie Boys is a 2008 South Korean film about male hosts who serve female clients in discreet salons tucked into the affluent fashion districts of southern Seoul.

Its international English title The Moonlight of Seoul is taken from a 1970s short novel by Kim Seung-wook, 서울의 달빛 0장 ("The Moonlight of Seoul – Part Zero"), which explores the aura of Seoul's nightlife.

In director Yoon Jong-bin's own words, the film "depicts youths living in the exotic, affluent backdrop of Gangnam and those kicking and screaming to survive in the superficial, capitalistic society."

Cast 
 Yoon Kye-sang as Seung-woo 
 Ha Jung-woo as Jae-hyun
 Yoon Jin-seo as Ji-won 
 Lee Seung-min as Han-byul 
 Ma Dong-seok as Chang-woo 
 Yoo Ha-joon as Won-tae 
 Kwon Yul  as Ji-hoon 
 Yoon Ah-jeong as Mi-seon
 Bae Jin-ah as Seon-joo
 Hong Yi-joo as Joo-hee
 Jang Ji-won as Myung-ah
 Jung Bo-hoon as Soon-hee
 Kim Young-hoon as Tae-woo (uncredited)

Awards and nominations

References

External links 
  
 
 
 

2008 films
2008 romantic drama films
South Korean romantic drama films
Films about prostitution in South Korea
Films set in Seoul
Films set in Japan
Films shot in Seoul
Films shot in Japan
Films directed by Yoon Jong-bin
Lotte Entertainment films
2000s Korean-language films
2000s South Korean films